Thomasia purpurea is a small, flowering shrub in the family Malvaceae  that is endemic to the southwest of Western Australia. It has green oblong-shaped leaves and pinkish purple flowers.

Description
The small flowers are cup-shaped, droopin, borne in clusters of 1–3 at the end of branches, lacking petals and  calyx lobes pinkish purple. Flowering occurs between  April and December.

Taxonomy and naming
The species was first formally described by Swedish botanist Jonas Carlsson Dryander and the description was published in  William Aiton's Hortus Kewensis in 1811 as Lasiopetalum purpureum. The type specimen was collected by botanist Robert Brown from King George Sound in 1801. In 1821 French botanist Jacques Etienne Gay placed the species in the genus Thomasia. The specific epithet (purpurea) means "purple".

Distribution and habitat
This species grows in coastal regions of south-west Western Australia on ridges, flat lands, seasonally wet locations and sandy hills.

References

purpurea
Rosids of Western Australia
Plants described in 1811